Nepal first competed at the Asian Games in 1951.

Medal tables

Medals by Asian Games

References